INFA is an initialism for:
International Federation of Netball Associations, former name of International Netball Federation
Informatica (stock ticker symbol), a software development company founded in 1993
International Federation of Aestheticians